The Electoral Court is a South African court that oversees the Electoral Commission (EC) and the conduct of elections. It was established by the Electoral Commission Act, 1996 to replace a Special Electoral Court which oversaw the 1994 elections, and has status similar to that of a division of the High Court.

The court consists of a judge of the Supreme Court of Appeal as chairman, two High Court judges, and two other members. All members are appointed by the President on the advice of the Judicial Service Commission.  the chairman is judge Boissie Mbha, who is also a judge of the Supreme Court of Appeal. The two judges appointed to the Court are C Lamont and W L Wepener, both judges of the Gauteng Division of the High Court. The member is Ms Sungaree Pather, an attorney.

The court has its administrative offices at the Supreme Court of Appeal in Bloemfontein but it may hear cases anywhere in South Africa. It meets only when a case is brought before it, so it is generally busy around election time but less so between national or local authority elections. Cases are generally, but not necessarily, heard by all five members of the court.

The court has the power to review the procedural fairness of any decision taken by the EC. It hears appeals on the correctness of any decision taken by the EC if it involves the interpretation of the law, and answers questions of legal interpretation referred by the EC. It also investigates allegations against members of the EC. The Electoral Court makes rules defining how disputes about the conduct of parties or candidates can be heard by the ordinary courts. It may also hear such disputes itself, but it cannot act as a criminal court.

References

External links
 Judgments of the Electoral Court

1996 establishments in South Africa
Elections in South Africa
Courts and tribunals established in 1996
Courts of South Africa
Electoral courts
Election law in South Africa